Other notable people share this name. See Thomas Lynch (disambiguation).

Thomas Lynch (1727–1776) was an American planter and statesman from South Carolina. He was a delegate to the Stamp Act Congress of 1765 and the Continental Congress from 1774 to 1776, and signed the 1774 Continental Association.

Political career
Lynch was born in St. James Parish, Berkeley County, South Carolina, in 1727. He served in the Colonial Legislature of South Carolina and represented the colony in the Stamp Act Congress, heading the committee which drafted the petition to the House of Commons.

Elected to both the First and Second Continental Congresses, Lynch joined Benjamin Franklin and Benjamin Harrison on a committee sent to Cambridge, Massachusetts, to confer with General George Washington upon "the most effectual method of continuing, supporting, and regulating the Continental Army." In the ensuing discussions, Washington told the committee of his plan to arm ships to prey upon British supply lines. The gentlemen from Congress approved of the scheme and recommended it to Congress, thus giving essential political support to the establishment of "George Washington's Navy," the first organized naval force of the new nation.

Family
Thomas Lynch's wife, Hannah Motte, was a sister of Isaac Motte, who became a South Carolina Congressman. Following her death during childbirth, Lynch married Annabella Josephiné Dé'Illiard; after Lynch's death, his widow Annabella married South Carolina Governor William Moultrie.  His daughter Elizabeth married James Hamilton; their son James Hamilton Jr. was elected as governor of South Carolina in 1830. Following Lynch's death from a stroke, their son Thomas Lynch Jr. was appointed to his seat in Congress and continued in a political career.

See also
 USS Lynch, a 1776 Continental Navy schooner named for Lynch

References 

 

1727 births
1776 deaths
Continental Congressmen from South Carolina
18th-century American politicians
American planters
American slave owners
Signers of the Continental Association